Angelos Lembesi (17 October 1917 – 1988) was a Greek alpine skier. He competed in two events at the 1952 Winter Olympics.

References

1917 births
1988 deaths
Greek male alpine skiers
Olympic alpine skiers of Greece
Alpine skiers at the 1952 Winter Olympics
Place of birth missing